IICT may refer to:
 Indian Institute of Chemical Technology
 Research Institute for Islamic Culture and Thought